is a Japanese yuri manga written and illustrated by tMnR. It was serialized in Ichijinsha's Comic Yuri Hime from 2016 to 2020, and is licensed for an English-language release by Kodansha Comics.

Synopsis 
While attending her brother's wedding, Uta finally comes to terms with her crush on Kaoru, her now sister-in-law. Uta enters a new stage of her life having to navigate living with her brother and Kaoru while trying to get over her unrequited feelings. However, as cracks in her brother's marriage begin to show, Uta finds Kaoru confiding in her more and making the process even harder.

Characters 
Uta - Voice: Sayaka Senbongi 
A hard-working high school student who tries to come to terms with her unrequited feelings for Kaoru, a childhood friend and now sister-in-law. She sometimes feels like she is a burden to others because of her mother's verbal abuse.
 
Kaoru - Voice: Marie Miyake 
A childhood friend of Uta and Reiichi. She went on to marry Reiichi and live together with him and his sister.

Reiichi - Voice: Yuya Nakada
Uta's brother. He and Kaoru dated in high school and married one year prior to the story’s start.

Media

Manga

Power Push 
On August 21, 2019, Ichijinsha released a Power Push reading of the first chapter, with Sayaka Senbongi playing Uta and Marie Miyake playing Kaoru.

Reception 
In Anime News Network's Fall 2019 Manga Guide,Rebecca Silverman from  gave the first volume 3 out of 4 stars. Silverman praises tMnR for avoiding making the story unrelentingly depressing and melodramatic by instead showing that Uta's has already accepted  her love will go unrequited. Faye Hopper went to give first volume 4 out of 4 stars, noting that "It deals with complicated, difficult issues with a sensitivity and grace you rarely see, and does so, surprisingly, while being light and pleasant." Anime UK News gave the first volume 8/10, praising the maturely and respect paid to the depiction of Uta's feelings.

The series has featured on BookWalker's top-selling manga ranking for 2020.

References

External links 
 Official English website
 

2016 manga
Ichijinsha manga
Kodansha manga
LGBT in anime and manga
Yuri (genre) anime and manga
2010s LGBT literature